Yarmolinsky (feminine Yarmolinskaya) is an East Slavic surname (Russian Ярмолинский, Ukrainian Ярмолинські).
The  Polish-language versions are  Jarmoliński/Jarmolińska. Notable people with this surname include:

 Avrahm Yarmolinsky (1890-1975), Ukrainian author
 Adam Yarmolinsky (1922-2000), American academic

East Slavic-language surnames